This article attempts to list the oldest extant buildings in the state of Michigan in the United States. Some dates are approximate and based upon dendochronology, architectural studies, and historical records.

To be listed here a site must:
date prior to 1850; or
be the oldest building in a region, large city, or oldest of its type (church, government building, style, etc.)

List

See also
List of the oldest buildings in the United States
National Register of Historic Places listings in Michigan

References 

Michigan
Architecture in Michigan
Oldest